Yu Haicheng is a Chinese sport shooter. He represents China at the 2020 Summer Olympics in Tokyo.

References

1998 births
Living people
Chinese male sport shooters
Shooters at the 2020 Summer Olympics
Olympic shooters of China